Doris Orgel is an Austrian-born American children's literature author.  She was born Doris Adelberg in Vienna, Austria on February 15, 1929.  In the 1930s she fled Vienna with her parents due to her Jewish descent. She lives in New York City and is a full-time children's author.

Her book The Devil in Vienna received a Phoenix Award Honor in 1998.  Her books Sarah's Room and Dwarf Long-Nose were illustrated by Hans Christian Andersen Award winning illustrator Maurice Sendak.

She has also translated children's books from German to English. Two of her translations, Nero Corleone: a Cat's Story by Elke Heidenreich and Daniel Half Human by David Chotjewitz, are Mildred L. Batchelder Honor Books, the award recognizing outstanding translated children's books.

She attended Radcliffe College from 1946 to 1948 and graduated cum laude from Barnard College in 1950.  She is married to Shelley Orgel, a medical doctor specializing in psychoanalysis, and has three children.

References

External links

 Biography  at University of Vienna (univie.ac.at)
 
  (previous page of browse report, under 'Orgel, Doris' without '1929–')

1929 births
American children's writers
Living people
Austrian women writers
American women children's writers
German–English translators
21st-century American women